Hezekiah Gold Rogers (February 22, 1811 – March 19, 1882) was the United States chargé d'affaires in Sardinia from 1840 to 1841.

Rogers, the eldest child of the Hon. Edward Rogers, member of the United States House of Representatives from New York, and of Sally Maria (Gold) Rogers, was born in Madison, N. Y., February 22, 1811.  He graduated from Yale College in 1831.  He studied law and began practice in Pittsburgh, Pa, and in 1837 was one of the delegates from Alleghany County to the convention for the revision of the Pennsylvania Constitution.  In June, 1840, he was appointed chargé d'affaires to the Kingdom of Sardinia by President Martin Van Buren, but showing symptoms of mental derangement he was superseded in November, 1841, and returned to his father's house. During his later life he was a wanderer.  He died in the county alms-house in Lancaster, Pa, March 19, 1882, in his 72d year. He was unmarried.

External links

 US State Department bio

1811 births
1882 deaths
People from Madison, New York
Yale College alumni
Pennsylvania lawyers
Ambassadors of the United States to Italy
19th-century American diplomats
19th-century American lawyers